Killer Bean Forever is a 2008 American computer-animated action film written, produced, and directed by Jeff Lew, starring Vegas E. Trip, Bryan Session, David Guilmette, Matthew Tyler and Jeff Lew. It was preceded by two web shorts: Killer Bean: The Interrogation in 1996, and Killer Bean 2: The Party in 2000. Taking place in a world of anthropomorphic coffee beans, the film tells the story of a bean assassin named Jack "Killer" Bean, who is sent to hunt down a crime boss, while he himself is hunted by mercenaries and the police.

In 2020, an animated series that continues the story of the film was announced, and premiered on September 6, 2020, but was cancelled in August 2021. In the same month, a game simply titled Killer Bean was announced, which also continues the film's story. The movie has obtained a cult following online since 2018.

Plot
 
One night, at 2:43 AM, bean assassin Jack "Killer" Bean is having problems sleeping due to several gangsters holding a loud party in a nearby warehouse. He calls their leader demanding that they turn down the music, but this request is blatantly refused, prompting Killer Bean to kill the gangsters in a fit of anger. Their leader is later revealed to be the nephew of Italian-American crime boss and drug lord Cappuccino. Shortly after, a police investigation led by Detective Cromwell occurs at the warehouse, which is known to be owned by Cappuccino. Vagan, a lieutenant and hitman who sells weapons for Cappuccino, arrives at the warehouse, discovering the massacre, and leaves after being briefly questioned by Cromwell.

That morning, Killer Bean is stopped from assassinating Cromwell (having seen him on the news) by a call from his boss, who warns him the warehouse shooting was reckless, and that only the "target" should be killed. Killer Bean assures him that the mission will succeed. In a Chinese restaurant located in Wavertree Town, an assassin named Jet Bean receives a call from his boss sending him on a mission in Beantown. The restaurant owner then forces him to pay the bills he had not paid for several months, but he refuses and leaves after attacking the chef, who was told by the owner that Jet Bean insulted his food. At the drug headquarters, Cappuccino holds a meeting with his lieutenants, knocking two of them out the window when they annoy him, before Vagan appears and informs him of the warehouse shooting and his nephew's death, so Cappuccino sends Vagan to kill Killer Bean. Meanwhile, Detective Cromwell analyses the evidence at the warehouse and finds Killer Bean's name on the bullets, before locating another one of Cappuccino's warehouse, just as Killer Bean arrives there to conduct another attack. Killer Bean finds the warehouse to be empty, but he finds a note reading "Shadow Bean, you are too late". Suddenly, a high caliber bullet strikes the ground just besides Killer Bean. Killer Bean sees that Vagan had shot at him from a nearby building with his sniper rifle, and Killer Bean and Vagan exchange fire for some moments. The battle ends after a bullet shot by Killer Bean strikes Vagan's sniper rifle, disabling its scope. Disarmed, Vagan flees the scene unscathed.

Shortly after, Killer Bean is found in a bar across the street by Cromwell, who suggests working together to bring Cappuccino down, but Killer Bean refuses. Before he leaves, Cromwell confronts him after finding a note Killer Bean found earlier referencing the "Shadow Beans", but Killer Bean throws him into the ground and leaves. After that, Cromwell calls his friend Harrison 'The Dye Beano', a police intelligence officer, who reveals the Shadow Beans were special assassins working for the Shadow Agency, a private organization that carried out secret government operations, but presumably disbanded years ago. That night, Killer Bean arrives at a third warehouse owned by Cappuccino, and kills both the gangsters he finds there and several mercenaries hired by Vagan to kill him, but is ultimately knocked out by an explosion. He awakens tied up to a chair, being interrogated by Cappuccino as to why he is trying to kill him. After breaking free, Killer Bean reveals that he is not after Cappuccino, but rather after Vagan. Outraged, Cappuccino then furiously fired Vagan for lying to him, only to get shot in retaliation.

During the standoff, Vagan revealed himself to be a former Shadow Bean code-named "Dark Bean" who betrayed the Shadow Agency and stole their database. In response to Killer Bean's accusations, Dark Bean reveals the Agency had degenerated into simply guns for hire, and that he chose to work for Cappuccino instead, so that he could use his knowledge on the gun trade to continue fighting crime, independent from the corrupt Agency. Killer Bean can't bring himself to believe Dark Bean, and ultimately kills him, not before he warns him that the Agency will now come after him as well. Detective Cromwell, who witnessed the entire ordeal from afar, arrives with police reinforcements to confront Killer Bean. After trying to pull out a big fight, Killer Bean allows himself to be arrested, believing that only the police can protect him from the Agency.

Shortly after, Jet Bean, who has been sent by the Shadow Agency to kill Killer Bean, arrives at the warehouse and learns from a police officer that he was arrested. Jet Bean then allows himself to be arrested by assaulting an officer for mocking him in a racist manner, and proceeds to kill everyone at the police station standing in his way to Killer Bean (save for Cromwell, who left earlier). Killer Bean tells Jet Bean that the Agency is only using them, but he doesn't believe him. After a final fight, Killer Bean prevails over Jet Bean, mortally shooting him. As he leaves, Killer Bean is called by his boss, who tells him to come in so they can "talk things over". He replies that he will come in, but it won't be for talking and drives off with a police van full of weapons.

Voice cast
 Vegas E. Trip as Jack "Killer" Bean. He is an anthropomorphic coffee bean and assassin working for the Shadow Agency as a Shadow Bean, until he finds out their true nature.
 Trip also voices DJ Bean, Cappuccino's nephew and a gangster who dreamed of being a DJ at a night club, but was killed by Killer Bean for annoying him with his loud music, the News Reporter, and other beans as extras.
 Bryan Session as Detective Cromwell, a police detective who is put in charge of hunting down both Killer Bean and Cappuccino.
 Session also voices Vagan (Dark Bean), a gangster running guns for Cappuccino and former Shadow Bean for the Agency, having quit after they betrayed him.
 Matthew Tyler as Cappuccino, an Italian international crime boss and drug lord who wants to exact revenge on Killer Bean for killing his nephew.
 Jeff Lew as Jet Bean, an Asian assassin working for the Shadow Agency who is sent to hunt down Killer Bean.
Lew also voices other beans as extras.
David Guilmette as the Leader of the Shadow Agency, Killer Bean and Jet Bean's mysterious boss who is only heard on the phone; credited as "The Voice".
Guilmette also voices Harry, a police officer and Detective Cromwell's friend, the Mercenary Leader, who claims to have hand-selected his squad at the Academy 10 years ago and, along with them, is sent to kill Killer Bean on Vagan's orders, The Bartender, the bar owner who works at the bar, and other beans as extras.

Production
The concept for Killer Bean came in a short produced by Jeff Lew in 1996 entitled "The Killer Bean: The Interrogation", which was later called "Killer Bean 1". Jeff Lew intended this short only to teach himself animation, and it only received about 3000 hits. After practicing animation for about 2 years, Lew started work on "The Killer Bean 2: The Party", a 7-minute short. "The Killer Bean 2" took about 3 years to create, and was released on iFilm in 2000. In about 6 months, it received about a million views, which was significant before YouTube. A later edit, "Killer Bean 2.1", was uploaded to DivX in 2004. Killer Bean 2.1 was also later uploaded to YouTube in 2009, which has since gained more than 4 million views.

After receiving various calls from movie producers that never developed, Lew decided to make a full feature film himself. The first rough draft of the screen play took about 5 months. Previsualization took about one and a half years. One mistake Lew regretted was not making the concept art before previz, which meant that many of the previz shots could not be reused for final animation. Lew then posted an ad on Craigslist for voices, and auditioned about 20 people and cast four. The concept artist for the characters was Von C. Caberte. By July 2005, all pre-production was completed.

The film took about five years to create, with approximately one and half years in pre-production and three years in animation. Killer Bean Forever had approximately 1000 animated shots. Generally, animators are given 1–4 weeks to complete one shot, and thus to create 1000 shots would have taken 20 years. Lew used an inexpensive 2D motion capture system to speed up animation, primarily with lip-sync. During this time, Lew also worked as an animator on major Hollywood productions including The Matrix Reloaded and X-Men.

Release
In 2008, the worldwide rights to Killer Bean Forever were acquired by Cinema Management Group. That same year, the film was screened for buyers at the Toronto Film Festival.

The film was released on DVD in the United States on July 14, 2009.

In May 2018, the film was officially uploaded to YouTube in its entirety in 4K resolution, gaining over 40 million views as of June 2022.

Reception
Scott McDanel of RMU Sentry Media called the film "an absolute dumpster fire," but wrote that he would "still highly recommend it as a 'it's-so-bad-it's-good' flick."

The movie was officially uploaded to YouTube by Jeff Lew in May 2018, where it has since garnered over 40 million views. This significantly contributed to the movie's cult following, causing moments and references of the film to become a Meme.

Earlier shorts: The Killer Bean 1 & 2
The first short, "Killer Bean: The Interrogation", was released in 1996. The short features Killer Bean captured by mercenaries who interrogate him.

The second short, "The Killer Bean 2: The Party", was released on August 8, 2000. The short is about Killer Bean being annoyed by the loud music at a nearby party held by some gangsters. When they refuse to turn it down, Killer Bean arrives to do it himself, but the gangsters won't go down without a fight.

A third short, "The Killer Bean 3: Forever", was originally intended to release in 2002, but was scrapped in favor of the movie Killer Bean Forever. The trailer featured Killer Bean on a roof, breathing in, and breathing out.

2020 web series
In January 2020, The Killer Bean Channel posted a picture on YouTube community revealing Killer Bean's return and will have a 10+ episode series, although it has been delayed since late February. The Twitter account of Killer Bean claimed that YouTubers and fans will voice act the characters in the series. On May 10, the first teaser of the miniseries was released to the Killer Bean Channel.

On May 10, 2020, The Return of Killer Bean, a teaser for what could come in the new series, was released onto YouTube. "The Return of Killer Bean" was released as a teaser for the upcoming 2020 series in 4K. The short features Killer Bean (Jeff Lew) attacking a group of mercenaries, but when the last surviving bean (Christopher Giersz) threatens to shoot a hole through his car door, just like he did with his mother's, Killer Bean attempts to reason with him. Claiming that the mercenary has some personal problems, Killer Bean lets him take his car and throws him the keys. The last bean tries to find the keys in some trash bags, but when he finds them, the keys are actually an explosive device. The explosion throws the mercenary into a garbage can, though he survives, before Killer Bean leaves in his car.

On September 6, 2020, the first episode was released.

On November 20, 2020, the second and final episode was released.

In August 2021, due to the new Killer Bean game in development and getting false copyright claims on YouTube before, Lew announced that the series is no longer in production.

On October 1, 2022, a new series titled Killer Bean - The Prequel was officially announced. Taking place before the events of Killer Bean Forever, the story follows Killer Bean's Shadow Bean training into the Shadow Agency. The first episode titled Driving School was released on September 29, 2022.

Cast 
Jack "Killer" Bean (voiced by Jeff Lew) - A bean assassin and a former Shadow Bean who is trying to hunt down and end the Shadow Agency.
MAX (voiced by Various Actors) - An AI drone built by Kessler who helps Killer Bean hunt down the Shadow Agency.
Kessler (voiced by Charles White Jr.)  - A former Shadow Bean and engineer who specializes in computers and built an AI drone named MAX.
Reximus (voiced by Max Lundgrem) - A gamer bean who is the leader of his clan.
Sniper (voiced by Rin Monjica) - A female assassin who is Reximus' second in command.

Episodes

Pilot (2020)

Season 1 (2020)

Mobile game
In 2012, a mobile game, Killer Bean: Unleashed, was released for Android and iOS. Taking place shortly after Killer Bean Forever, the story follows Killer Bean who is on the run from mercenaries, while hunting the Shadow Agency's top Shadow Bean, Major Firepower. In 2021, the game received several updates on Android, the first updating the game to a newer version of Unity to prepare for new levels. Then, the game was updated to use 3D models instead of sprites and added the Pixel levels. Later updates added new levels and enemies.

Killer Bean (video game) 
A third-person, open-world shooter game based on Killer Bean was announced on August 19, 2021. Lew plans on bringing the game to consoles such as the PS4, PS5, Xbox One and Series X/S, and Nintendo Switch for around $20 USD. There is a release date set for 2023. On Twitter and Steam Discussions, Lew gave more info about the game.

Killer Bean, Jet Bean, Vagan (Dark Bean), Detective Cromwell, and Chintow will be playable characters, all with different playing styles. The game will have a larger focus on action, and less sci-fi elements, compared to the YouTube series. The game will have text based dialogue, making for easier localization. The game is set to simply be titled Killer Bean. The game takes place after the two episodes of the now-cancelled Killer Bean YouTube series.

References

External links
 
 
A Killer Bean Story, a postmortem documentation of Killer Bean by Jeff Lew.
Official Killer Bean Merch

2008 films
2008 computer-animated films
Films about Asian Americans
Film and television memes
2008 action thriller films
2000s crime thriller films
American independent films
2000s American animated films
2008 directorial debut films
2000s English-language films